Kuwait–Pakistan relations refer to bilateral relations between Kuwait and Pakistan. Pakistan has an embassy in Kuwait City and Kuwait has an embassy in Islamabad and a consulate in Karachi. Kuwait and Pakistan are members of OIC.

Commercial, economic and cultural ties
Pakistani forces took an active part in the liberation of Kuwait along with coalition forces in 1991. After the end of the first Gulf War in 1991 Pakistani army engineers were involved in a program of mine clearance in the country. The present level of Kuwaiti exports to Pakistan is $750 million. Pakistani exports to Kuwait are $50 million. Kuwait and Pakistan have decided to expand their mutual trade to $1.0 billion annually in the next two to three years.

COVID-19 pandemic 
During the COVID-19 pandemic, Pakistan sent hundreds of doctors, nurses and technicians to Kuwait.

Expatriate communities
The number of Pakistanis living in Kuwait is estimated to be around 107,084 .

Aid to Pakistan
Kuwait was also the first country to send aid to isolated mountain villages in Kashmir after the quake of 2005, also offering the largest amount of aid in the aftermath of the quake ($100m).

In response to the 2005 Kashmir earthquake, the Kuwaiti government pledged Pakistan US$100 million. Moreover, in the aftermath of the 2010 Pakistan floods, the Kuwaiti government lifted a long-standing ban on collecting donations in public.

Controversy
A 2017 fake news story of a visa ban by Kuwait was summarily dismissed as nonsense.

See also
 Foreign relations of Kuwait
 Foreign relations of Pakistan

References

 
Pakistan
Bilateral relations of Pakistan